Henry George Murphy, aka H. G. Murphy (1884 in Birchington, Kent – 1939) was an English art-deco silversmith.

Career
Murphy was apprenticed to Henry Wilson in 1899. At age 14 he entered the Central School of Arts and Crafts in London.

In July 1912 he was employed by Emil Lettre in Berlin. He found the work unfulfilling and left after six weeks. The same year he opened his own workshop in London.
During World War I he enlisted in the Royal Navy Air Service. In 1928 he started the Falcon Studio, comprising a workshop and retail outlet in Weymouth Street, London.

He returned to the Central School and remained there, teaching goldsmithing and enamelling, and became the first head of silversmithing, and later principal of the school in 1936.

Arms

References

Further reading
 A Short History of Jewellery Designer Henry George Murphy at Favourite Collectables, 21 Jan 2112. Retrieved 20 May 2013

External links
 Platt War Memorial Website

English silversmiths
People from Birchington-on-Sea
1884 births
1939 deaths
Art Deco sculptors
20th-century British sculptors